Kalateh-ye Habib (also Romanized as Kalāteh-ye Ḩabīb) is a village in Milanlu Rural District, in the Central District of Esfarayen County, North Khorasan Province, Iran. At the 2006 census, its population was 119, in 31 families.

References 

Populated places in Esfarayen County